Techtro Swades United Women's Football Club is an Indian women's football department of  Techtro Swades United FC. The team is based in Una, Himachal Pradesh. It competes in the Himachal Women's League.

The club was established in March 2021. In the same month, they were crowned as the champions of inaugural edition of Himachal Women's League and advanced to Indian Women's League.

Competitive record

Honours
Himachal Women's League
Champions (1): 2020–21

References

Football clubs in Himachal Pradesh
Una, Himachal Pradesh
Association football clubs established in 2020
2021 establishments in Himachal Pradesh